The Gagauz are a Turkic ethnic group native to southern Moldova (Gagauzia, Taraclia District, Basarabeasca District) and southwestern Ukraine (Budjak). Gagauz are mostly Eastern Orthodox Christians. The term Gagauz is also often used as a collective naming of Turkic people living in the Balkans, speaking Gagauz language, a language separated from Balkan Gagauz Turkish.

Etymology
Gagauz is the most widely accepted singular and plural form of the name, and some references use Gagauzy (from Ukrainian) or Gagauzi. Other variations including Gagauzes and Gagauzians appear rarely.

Before the Russian Revolution they were commonly referred to as "Turkish speaking Bulgars". Gagauz agricultural settlers in Uzbekistan called themselves "Eski Bulgars" (meaning Old Bulgars) in the 1930s.

According to Astrid Menz:

Geographical distribution
Outside Moldova, a minority of Gagauz people live in the Ukrainian regions of Odesa and Zaporizhzhia. They are also in Kazakhstan, Kyrgyzstan, Uzbekistan, Bulgaria, Greece, Romania, Brazil, Turkmenistan, Belarus, Estonia, Latvia, Georgia, Turkey, and the Russian region of Kabardino-Balkaria.

History

Origins
The origin of the Gagauz is obscure. In the beginning of the 20th century, a Bulgarian historian counted 19 different theories about their origin. A few decades later the Gagauz ethnologist M. N. Guboglo increased the number to 21. In some of those theories the Gagauz people are presented as descendants of the Pechenegs, the Cumans-Kipchaks or a clan of Seljuk Turks or a mix of all. Others doubt altogether that the Gagauz are of Turkic origin at all and claimed that they are of Turkified Bulgarian or Greek origin. The fact that their confession is Eastern Orthodox Christianity may suggest that their ancestors already lived in the Balkans prior to the Ottoman conquest in the late 14th century.

Seljuk (Anatolian) hypothesis
According to the 15th-century Oghuzname narrative, in 1261 Turkoman dervish Sari Saltuk accompanied a group of Turkomans into Dobruja, where they were settled by the Byzantine Emperor Michael VIII to protect the northern frontier of the empire. However, Dobruja was occupied by Tatars in the same period. The same source places him in Crimea after 1265, among the Turkomans transferred there by Tatar khan Berke, and after 1280 mentions him leading the nomads back to Dobruja. After the death of Sari Saltik, part of the Turkomans returned to Anatolia and became the Ancestors of the Karamanlides, while other remained and became Christians, becoming the ancestors of the Gagauz people. The name Gagauz may be a reminiscence of the name Kaykaus II. Accordijng to A.F. Bajora, this even was a myth brought in Dobruja by Tatars and not a true historical event.

The Seljuk theory has been criticized because, archaeologically, no "secular and compact" presence of Seljuks has been confirmed. It is also hard to believe that Seljuk Muslims converted to Christianity when their fellow Muslim Tatars lived in the North.

Steppe hypothesis
The Steppe hypothesis suggests that the Gagauz may be descendants of other Turkic nomadic tribes than Seljuks: Bulgars and Cumans-Kipchaks from the Eurasian steppes. In the 19th century, before their migration to Bessarabia, the Gagauz from the Bulgarian territories of the Ottoman Empire considered themselves Bulgarians. Ethnological research suggest that  "Gagauz" was a linguistic distinction and not ethnic. The Gagauz at that time called themselves "Hasli Bulgar" (True Bulgarians) or "Eski Bulgar" (Old Bulgarians) and considered the term Gagauz to be demeaning, when applied to them by the Slavic-speaking Bulgarians (whom the Gagauz called toukan). The Gagauz called their language "Turkish" and claimed descent from then-Turkic-speaking Bulgars who in the 7th century established the First Bulgarian Empire on the Danube. Indeed, one modern Gagauz surname is Qipcakli. The Russian Empire Census of 1897 did not distinguish the Gagauz as a specific group, but it reported the existence of 55,790 native speakers of a "Turkish language" (presumably the Gagauz language) in the Bessarabia Governorate.

According to historian A.F. Bajora, although this theory has many convincing arguments, the main counter-argument to this theory is that the Cuman language and the Gagauz language were totally different languages.

Greek hypothesis 
According to a version of this hypothesis, the Gagauz immigrated to the Balkans from Anatolia and, while they kept their Greek Orthodox religion, they got linguistically assimilated (Turkified). According to another version, the Ottomans found a native Greek population in Dobruja in the 14th century and, due to their population being lower than the number of Turkish settlers, this Greek population, too, kept their Greek Orthodox religion but got linguistically assimilated (Turkified). In this vein of linguistic assimilation, the Gagauz have been compared to the Karamanlides.

An argument that favors the Greek hypothesis is given by genetic research, which shows that the Gagauz are genetically European. Additionally, during the Greek War of Independence the Gagauz in Bessarabia and Bulgaria enlisted in the armies of Alexander Ypsilantis and fought for the Greek side in the war. The Greek hypothesis was favored most notably by Konstantin Jireček, among others.

Bulgarian hypothesis 
Bulgarians argue that the Gagauz are Turkified Bulgarians because most of the Gagauz people in Bulgaria consider themselves natives ("Erli"). According to this theory, the Gagauz are either descendants of Proto-Bulgarian origin, or of Slavic origin, being no different than the Slavicized Bulgarians before the Turkish language spread among them. According to A.F. Bajora this theory has many strong arguments, but states that the fact that  Ottomans did not force their subjects to accept their language and only compelled them to convert to the Islam and that not all Gagauz in Bulgaria consider themselves Bulgariass are strong counter-arguments.

Modern history

Between 1820 and 1846, the Russian Empire allocated land to the Gagauz and gave them financial incentives to settle in Bessarabia in the settlements vacated by the Nogai tribes. They settled in Bessarabia along with Bassarabian Bulgarians, mainly in Avdarma, Comrat (or Komrat), Congaz (Kongaz), Tomai, Cișmichioi and other former Nogai villages located in the central Budjak region. Originally, the Gagauz also settled in several villages belonging to boyars throughout southern Bessarabia and the Principality of Moldavia, but soon moved to join their kin in the Bugeac. Until 1869, the Gagauz in Bessarabia were described as Bulgarians. During the Romanian rule of southernmost Bessarabia (1856–1878), they supported Bulgarian schools in their settlements and participated in the Bulgarian national movement. Therefore, some ethnologists (Karel Škorpil, Gavril Zanetov (himself a Gagauz), Benyo Tsonev) claim Bulgarian origin for the Gagauz.

In the 1860s some Gagauz resettled to the vicinity of Berdiansk on the Sea of Azov coast, and in 1908–1914 to Central Asia.

With the exception of a six-day independence in the winter of 1906, when a peasant uprising declared the autonomous Comrat Republic, the Gagauz people have mainly been ruled by the Russian Empire, Romania, the Soviet Union, and Moldova.

The wave of Stolypin agrarian policies carried some Gagauz to Kazakhstan between 1912 and 1914, and later yet another group settled in Uzbekistan during the very troubled years of initial collectivization. So as not to lose their civil rights, they called themselves Bulgarians in the 1930s; The Gagauz of the village of Mayslerge in the Tashkent District retain that designation to this day.

In 1970 the total population of the Gagauz reached 156,600 in the USSR (26,400 of them lived in the Ukrainian SSR and 125,000 in the Moldavian SSR). In 1979, about 173,000 Gagauz lived in the USSR.

Gagauz nationalism remained an intellectual movement during the 1980s but strengthened by the end of the decade as both elites and opposition groups in the Soviet Union began to embrace nationalist ideals. In 1988, activists from the local intelligentsia aligned with other ethnic minorities to create the movement known as the "Gagauz People" (Gagauz: Gagauz halkı). A year later, the "Gagauz People" held its first assembly which accepted the resolution to create an autonomous territory in the southern Moldavian SSR, with Comrat designated as capital. The Gagauz nationalist movement increased in popularity when Moldovan was accepted as the official language of the Republic of Moldova in August 1989.

Gagauz nationalism and Republic of Moldova 
In August 1990, Comrat declared itself an autonomous republic, but the Moldovan government annulled the declaration as unconstitutional. The Gagauz were also worried about the implications for them if Moldova reunited with Romania, as seemed increasingly likely. Support for the Soviet Union remained high, with a local referendum in March 1991 yielding an almost unanimous "yes" vote to stay in the USSR; Moldovans in Gagauzia, however, boycotted the referendum. Many Gagauz supported the Moscow coup attempt, further straining relations with Chişinău. However, when the Moldovan parliament voted on whether Moldova should become independent, six of the twelve Gagauz deputies voted in favor.

Gagauzia declared itself independent as the Gagauz Republic on 19 August 1991—the day of the Moscow coup attempt—followed by Transnistria in September. In February 1994, President Mircea Snegur, opposed to Gagauz independence, promised a Gagauz autonomous region. Snegur also opposed the suggestion that Moldova become a federal state made up of three "republics": Moldova, Gagauzia, and Transnistria. In 1994, the Moldovan parliament awarded "the people of Gagauzia" the right of "external self-determination" should the status of the country change. This means that in the event that Moldova decided to join another country (by all accounts this referred to Romania), the Gagauz would be entitled to decide whether to remain or not a part of the new state by means of a self-determination referendum.

As a result of a referendum to determine Gagauzia's borders, thirty settlements (three towns and twenty-seven villages) expressed their desire to be included in the Gagauz Autonomous Territorial Unit. In 1995, George Tabunshik was elected to serve as the Governor (Bashkan) of Gagauzia for a four-year term, as were the deputies of the local parliament, "The People's Assembly" (Halk Topluşu) and its chairman Peter Pashali.

Population genetics
In DNA comparisons, the Gagauz were found to be more closely related genetically to neighboring southeastern European groups than to linguistically related Anatolian populations. More considerable distinctions in the distribution of Y chromosome components appeared between the Gagauz and other Turkic peoples.

The similarity to neighboring populations may be due to the lack of social barriers between the local and the Turkic-Orthodox populations of the Balkan Peninsula. Another possibility is language shift in accordance with the dominant minority model, i.e. Turkification.

Gagauz belong to Y-DNA haplogroups I2a (23.6%), R1a (19.1%), G (13.5%), R1b (12.4%), E1b1b1a1 (11.1%), J2 (5.6%) and Haplogroup N (2.2%). Finally, the phylogenetic analysis of Y-DNA situates Gagauz most proximal to Bulgarians, Macedonians, Romanians, Serbs and other Balkan populations, resulting in a high genetic distance from the Turkish people and other Turkic peoples. The analyses showed that Gagauz belong to the Balkan populations, suggesting that the Gagauz language represents a case of language replacement in southeastern Europe. According to a more detailed autosomal analysis of thousands of SNPs, not just of the sex chromosome, Gagauz are most proximal to ethnic Macedonians, followed by Greek Macedonians apart from Thessaloniki, and others such as Bulgarians, Romanians and Montenegrins.

After a genetic comparison between the populations of the Balkans, Anatolia, and Central Asia, the results showed that the Gagauz are part of the Balkan genetic group.

Language
The Gagauz language belongs to the Oghuz branch of the Turkic languages, which also includes the Azerbaijani, Turkish, and Turkmen languages. The Gagauz language is particularly close to the Balkan Turkish dialects spoken in Greece, northeastern Bulgaria, and in the Kumanovo and Bitola areas of North Macedonia. The Balkan Turkic languages, including Gagauz, are a typologically interesting case, because they are closely related to Turkish and at the same time contain a North-Turkic (Tatar or Kypchak) element besides the main South-Turkic (Oghuz) element (Pokrovskaya, 1964). The modern Gagauz language has two dialects: central (or "Bulgar") and southern (or maritime).

Culture

Economy
The traditional economy centered on animal husbandry (particularly sheep raising) and agriculture that combined grain and market gardening with viticulture. Even in the recent past, despite the cultural similarity of the Gagauz to the Bulgarians of Bessarabia, there were important differences between them: the Bulgarians were peasant farmers; although the Gagauz also farmed, they were essentially pastoralist in outlook.

Religion
The vast majority of Gagauz are Eastern Orthodox Christians. In Turkey the Muslim Gagauz are called Gajal.

There have been a number of attempts from the 1930s into the 21st century to tie the Turkish Orthodox Patriarchate with the ethnically Turkic, Greek Orthodox Gagauz minority in Bessarabia.

Marriages 

For Gagauz, Moldova was characterized by the predominance of mono-ethnic marriages: out of 100 marriages prisonered in 1970, mono-ethnic were 73, and out of 100 marriages concluded in 2003 were 77. In 2003, Gagauz Men Moldova became marked with women of their nationality (78%), less often with Moldavians (9%), grinders (5%), Russians (4%) and Ukrainians (3%). For Gagauz women of Moldova in 2003, these indicators amounted to respectively: 75%, 8%, 5%, 4% and 5%. For Gagauz, Chisinau is characteristic, on the contrary, mainly national-mixed marriages, which in 2000 accounted for 97% of all marriages of the Gagauz of both sexes. For 2018, the number of mono ethnic marriages decreased.

Names 

The Gagauz name consists of a personal name, patronymic and surname. The most recognizable form of a name usually consists of a given name and a surname. Such a system was established among the Gagauz in the second half of the 20th century. Modern personal Gagauz names belong to different eras. A large part of them is of Greek origin (Лія - Lia, Анатолій - Anatoly, Александр - Alexander, Ірина - Irina, Варвара - Varvara), of Hebrew origin (Марія - Maria, Семен - Semyon, Анна - Anna, Іванна - Ivanna, etc.), of Romance origin (Домна - Domna, Константин - Constantine). Sometimes they can also be of Russian origin (Віра - Vira, Володимир - Vladimir) and of Bulgarian origin (Марин - Marin). Recently, the Gagauz have been increasingly borrowing foreign names.

The name of the child is given in two ways:

 named after grandparents
 by the name of godparents

Gagauz surnames are of Balkan origin. Mostly they are from the Gagauz, Bulgarian, Greek languages. In addition, surnames come from professions, street nicknames, and the father's name. When concluding a civil marriage, women take the surname of their spouse.

Food 

The staple food of Gagauz cuisine is grain, in many varieties. A series of family holidays and rituals was connected with the baking of wheat bread, both leavened loaves (e.g., kalaches) and unleavened flatcakes.

The favorite dish was a layered pie stuffed with sheep's milk cheese and soaked with sour cream before baking. Other delicacies were pies with crumbled pumpkin and sweet pies made with the first milk of a cow that had just calved. The traditional ritual dish called kurban combined bulgar wheat porridge with a slaughtered (or sacrificed) ram and is further evidence of the origins of the Gagauz in both the Balkan world and the steppe-pastoral complex. Peppered meat sauces are especially important: one combines onion and finely granulated porridge, while another is tomato-based. A red house wine is served with dinner and supper. Head cheese is an indispensable component of holiday meals.

Clothing

Women's
Toward the end of the 19th century, in good weather, a Gagauz woman's costume consisted of a canvas shirt, a sleeveless dress, a smock, and a large black kerchief. In winter, they donned a dress with sleeves, a cloth jacket, and a sleeveless fur coat. Required features of female dress were earrings, bracelets, beads, and, among wealthy Gagauz, a necklace of gold coins. "So many of their decorations are hung about," wrote a pre-Revolutionary researcher, "that they cover the entire breast down to the waist."

Men's
Traditional male clothing included a shirt, cloth pants, a wide red sash or belt, and a hat. The winter cap was made of Karakul sheep wool. The shepherd's costume was the usual shirt combined with sheepskin pants with the fleece turned in, a sleeveless fur coat, and a short sheepskin jacket, the latter sometimes decorated with red-on-green stitching.

Ukrainian Gagauz

Since 1991, the Gagauz nation became a trans-border nation located in Budjak and divided between Moldova and Ukraine. In Ukraine, Gagauz people mainly live near the Bessarabian Bulgarians community around the city of Bolhrad. According to a recent Ukrainian Census, the Gagauz population accounts for 31,923 people with 27,617 (86.5%) of them living in Odesa Oblast (Budjak area).
Dmytrivka
Oleksandrivka
Kotlovyna
Vynohradivka
Stari Troyany

See also
Gagauzia
Gagauz language
Gagauz Halkı
Transnistria War
Gagauz people in Moldova
Uzes
Gagauz World Congress

References

Bibliography
Vanya Mateeva, 2006 Sofia, "Гагаузите - още един поглед" ["The Gagauz - yet another view"]
Dimitris Michalopoulos, “The Metropolitan of the Gagauz: Ambassador Tanrıöver and the problem of Romania’s Christian Orthodox Turks”, Turkey & Romania. A history of partnership and collaboration in the Balkans, Istanbul: Union of Turkish World Municipalities and Istanbul University, 2016, p. 567-572. 
Shabashov A.V., 2002, Odessa, Astroprint, "Gagauz: terms of kinship system and origin of the people", (Шабашов А.В., "Гагаузы: система терминов родства и происхождение народа")
Mikhail Guboglo, 1967,  "Этническая принадлежност гагаузов". Советская этнография, No 3 [Ethnic identity of the Gagauz. Soviet ethnography journal, Issue No 3.]
Dmitriev N.K., 1962, Moscow, Science, "Structure of Türkic languages", articles "About lexicon of Gagauz language", "Gagauz etudes", "Phonetics of Gagauz language", (Дмитриев Н.К., "Структура Тюткских Языков", статьи "К вопросу о словарном составе гагаузского языка", "Гагаузские этюды", "Фонетика гагаузского языка")
Mihail Çakır, 1934, Basarabyalı Gagavuzların İstoryası ["History of the Gagauz people of Bessarabia"]
Kowalski, T., 1933 Kraków, "Les Turcs et la langue turque de la Bulgarie du Nord-Est". ["The Turks and the Turkic language of North-Eastern Bulgaria"]
Škorpil, K. and H., 1933 Praha, "Материали към въпроса за съдбата на прабългарите и на северите и към въпроса за произхода на съвременните гагаузи". Byzantinoslavica, T.5

Further reading

 
Gagauzia
Ethnic groups in Moldova
Ethnic groups in Bulgaria
Ethnic groups in Kazakhstan
Ethnic groups in Kyrgyzstan
Ethnic groups in Romania
Ethnic groups in Russia
Ethnic groups in Ukraine
Ethnic groups in Uzbekistan
Eastern Orthodox Christian communities
Turkic peoples of Europe
Turkic Christians